Zabrus pecoudi is a species of black coloured ground beetle in the Platyzabrus subgenus that is endemic to Spain.

References

Beetles described in 1942
Beetles of Europe
Endemic fauna of Spain
Zabrus